Jody Vangheluwe (born 15 July 1997) is a Belgian footballer who plays as a defender for Women's Super League club Club YLA and the Belgium women's national team.

References

External links
 
 
 Profile at soccerdonna.de 
 
 Club YLA profile
 profile at Instagram

1997 births
Living people
Belgian women's footballers
Women's association football defenders
Club Brugge KV (women) players
Belgium women's international footballers
UEFA Women's Euro 2022 players
Super League Vrouwenvoetbal players